Marčeta is a surname. Notable people with the surname include:

Damjan Marčeta (born 1994), Serbian footballer
Danijel Marčeta (born 1989), Slovenian footballer
Philipp Marceta (born 1993), Austrian footballer

Serbian surnames